Asherat may refer to:
 Oshrat, a settlement in Israel
 Ashret, a settlement in northern Pakistan